Closing the Ring is a 2007 romantic drama film directed by Richard Attenborough and starring Shirley MacLaine, Christopher Plummer, Mischa Barton, Stephen Amell, Neve Campbell, Pete Postlethwaite, and Brenda Fricker. It was the final film directed by Attenborough, then aged 83, who died seven years later. The film was released in both the Republic of Ireland and the United Kingdom on 28 December 2007. Closing the Ring is an international co-production between the United Kingdom, Canada, and United States.

Plot
In rural Michigan in 1991, Marie Harris (Neve Campbell) delivers the eulogy at the funeral of her father Chuck (David Alpay), a U.S. Army Air Force veteran who had fought in World War II. The church is full of veterans who knew and loved him. Her mother Ethel Ann (Shirley MacLaine) is sitting out on the church porch, smoking and nursing a hangover.

Ethel Ann is totally indifferent about Chuck's death, which only her friend Jack Etty (Christopher Plummer) seems to understand. Marie is furious with her mother and with her implication that she slept with many of the veterans when they were all young, but then Ethel relents and says that she was always faithful. It quickly emerges that there is a lot Marie does not know about her mother's past and the true story of her love life.

A young Ethel Ann (Mischa Barton) was in love with young farmer, Teddy Gordon (Stephen Amell), who builds a house with his best friends Jack and Chuck. Her parents think she is dating "good old reliable" Chuck (all three are in love with her), but within days of the Pearl Harbor attack, she has accepted Teddy's gold ring and unofficially married him – with Jack and Chuck as witnesses. The three young men fly out the next day. Teddy and Jack are stationed at RAF Langford Lodge near Belfast, where Jack eventually plans to propose to Eleanor (Kirsty Stuart), an Irish tart.

Jimmy Riley (Martin McCann), Eleanor's young adult grandson, is in 1991 Belfast when he encounters local elder Michael Quinlan (Pete Postlethwaite), who is digging for wreckage of a crashed B-17 aircraft on nearby Black Mountain. Jimmy finds a ring at the site, becoming determined to return it to the woman from the "Ethel & Teddy" inscription. The U.S. VA identify an Ethel that crash victim Teddy Gordon left his belongings to.

Inadvertently caught up in The Troubles, Jimmy flees Belfast, travelling to Michigan to give Ethel the ring. She reveals a wall covered in souvenirs of Teddy, which Jack and Chuck boarded up for her shortly after his death in June 1944. Marie is shocked and furious to learn that her mother still mourns for him, finally understanding why Ethel shut out Marie and Chuck. Jack later tells her the full story, including his own three failed marriages (his son, Pete (Allan Hawco), soon realizes Jack always loved Ethel), her refusal to leave the house Teddy built for her, and her taking ten years to marry Chuck.

Ethel Ann travels to Belfast with Jimmy. As she holds the hand of a British soldier killed in an IRA car-bomb attack, Quinlan confesses to Ethel Ann that he, as a teenager, was on Black Mountain when Teddy died. Teddy made him promise to give her the ring and tell her she must be free to make her own choice in love. A tearful Quinlan tells her he should have reached out to her back then, and that he spent 50 years looking for the ring that was lost in the final blast that killed Teddy, regretfully (now) thinking she needed it as much as she needed his dying words.

Joining Ethel in Belfast, Jack finally admits that he has always loved her. She is finally able to cry and properly grieve for Teddy. She and Jack embrace lovingly, completing her sweep through Teddy and his two best friends.

Main cast

Shirley MacLaine as Ethel Ann Harris
Mischa Barton as Young Ethel Ann
Christopher Plummer as Jack Etty
Gregory Smith as Young Jack
Stephen Amell as Teddy Gordon
Neve Campbell as Marie Harris
Pete Postlethwaite as Michael Quinlan
John Travers as Young Michael Quinlan
Brenda Fricker as Eleanor Riley
Kirsty Stuart as Young Eleanor
David Alpay as Chuck Harris
Allan Hawco as Peter Etty
Ian McElhinney as Cathal Thomas
Martin McCann as Jimmy Riley

Production
Closing the Ring was filmed in Toronto and Hamilton, Ontario, Canada, and Belfast, County Antrim, Northern Ireland.

The B-17G used in the movie was Yankee Lady from the Yankee Air Museum (Ypsilanti, Michigan), which was also used in the movie Tora! Tora! Tora!. It was flown by Captain D. Eugene Wedekemper.

Festival appearances
Closing the Ring had its world premiere at the Toronto International Film Festival on 14 September 2007. The film received its UK premiere at the London Film Festival on 21 October 2007.

Reception
Closing the Ring attracted a mixed critical response. 

According to the Toronto International Film Festival, it "exemplifies the balance between the epic and the intimate that has been the hallmark of Lord Richard Attenborough's venerable career ... Attenborough traces multiple themes with ease and grace, giving his celebrated ensemble cast ample opportunity to shine". It concluded that the film is "a remarkable tale of love, loss and redemption that stands proudly among the films of one of the cinema's living legends. Deftly weaving together different eras and locales, Attenborough has produced another grand canvas about the emotional repercussions of a wartime promise."

Derek Malcolm of the Evening Standard wrote that it "... is well-acted throughout and it has a romantic appeal that is not to be sneered at ..."

Alan Morrison of Empire wrote "After recent disappointments, Sir Dickie Attenborough is back on better, albeit old-fashioned, form."

Philip French of The Observer wrote "Woodward's script is more than a little contrived, as well as over-emphatic. But Attenborough has infused it with warmth and mature insight, and older members of the audience are likely to find it extremely moving."

Laura Bushell of BBCi Films called the film a "... looping tale of love and loss in WWII which is so old fashioned in its aspirations, it's hard to see why new audiences would flock to see it."

Joe Leydon in his Variety review, called the film "... decades-skipping schmaltz" and an "aggressively bittersweet yet oddly uninvolving drama."

References

Notes

Citations

Bibliography

 Beck, Simon D. The Aircraft-Spotter's Film and Television Companion. Jefferson, North Carolina: McFarland & Company, 2016. .

External links
 
 
 
 
 Closing the Ring at Yahoo! Movies

2007 films
2007 romantic drama films
American aviation films
American romantic drama films
American war drama films
British aviation films
British romantic drama films
British war drama films
Canadian aviation films
Canadian romantic drama films
Canadian war drama films
Films about the Irish Republican Army
Films directed by Richard Attenborough
Films scored by Jeff Danna
Films set in Northern Ireland
Films set in Michigan
Films set in 1941
Films set in 1944
Films set in 1991
Films shot in Hamilton, Ontario
Films shot in Northern Ireland
Films set in Belfast
Political drama films
War romance films
Films about The Troubles (Northern Ireland)
Films produced by Richard Attenborough
English-language Canadian films
2000s English-language films
2000s American films
2000s Canadian films
2000s British films